The 1932 United States presidential election in Idaho took place on November 8, 1932, as part of the 1932 United States presidential election. State voters chose four representatives, or electors, to the Electoral College, who voted for president and vice president.

Idaho was won by Governor Franklin D. Roosevelt (D–New York), running with Speaker John Nance Garner, with 58.66 percent of the popular vote, against incumbent President Herbert Hoover (R–California), running with Vice President Charles Curtis, with 38.27 percent of the popular vote. This is the only occasion when Clark County has voted for a Democratic presidential candidate.

Results

Results by county

See also
 
 
 United States presidential elections in Idaho

Notes

References

Idaho
1932
1932 Idaho elections